Nomada obtusifrons  is a Palearctic species of nomad bee.

References

External links
Images representing  Nomada obtusifrons 

Hymenoptera of Europe
Nomadinae
Insects described in 1848
Taxa named by William Nylander (botanist)